Judge Roy Scream is a wooden roller coaster located at Six Flags Over Texas in Arlington, Texas. It uses a custom-built out and back layout, designed with the consideration that families would ride the attraction.

Judge Roy Scream was introduced in 1980 as the park's first wooden roller coaster. Judge Roy Scream sits adjacent to the park's entry lake. Guests visiting Six Flags Over Texas must use a tunnel in the Goodtimes Square section to travel under the park's parking lot entrance road to get to the attraction. The name Judge Roy Scream refers to Judge Roy Bean, as implied by a sign in the line describing the 19th century Justice of the Peace and of course the similarity of the two names.

History
On November 30, 1979, it was announced that Judge Roy Scream would be coming to Six Flags Over Texas. The ride opened on March 1, 1980 at a cost of $2.1 million.

During the 1994 season, Judge Roy Scream was running backwards. This was supposed to happen for 10 weeks. Following high demand, it lasted for the remainder of the season.

In 2002, Chris Sawyer's RollerCoaster Tycoon 2 included the roller coaster as part of a larger Six Flags roller coaster tie-in.

In 2006, Six Flags over Texas hosted a 45-hour marathon ride on the Judge Roy Scream. There were a total of 19 contestants; ten from ACE (American Coaster Enthusiasts) and nine radio contestants.

References

Roller coasters operated by Six Flags
Roller coasters in Texas
Roller coasters introduced in 1980
Six Flags Over Texas